Russian archaeology begins in the Russian Empire in the 1850s and becomes Soviet archaeology in the early 20th century.  
The journal Sovetskaya arkheologiya is published from 1957.

Archaeologists

Sites

major archaeological cultures and sites in Russia
Kermek (:ru:Кермек (стоянка))
Bogatyri/Sinyaya Balka (:ru:Богатыри/Синяя балка)
Palaeolithic site Kostyonki
Sungir
Yana RHS (:ru:Янская стоянка)
Afontova Gora
Mal'ta–Buret' culture (Upper Paleolithic)
Khvalynsk culture (Eneolithic)
Fatyanovo–Balanovo culture (Chalcolithic)
Novotitorovka culture (Early Bronze Age)
Maykop culture (Early Bronze Age)
Maykop kurgan
Yamna culture
Afanasevo culture (Early Bronze Age)
Abashevo culture (Bronze Age)
Andronovo culture (Middle to Late Bronze Age)
Arkaim
Sintashta
Srubna culture (Late Bronze to Iron Age)
Tanais (Late Bronze to Iron Age)
Pazyryk culture (Iron Age)
Tmutarakan
Staraya Ladoga (Viking Age)
Rurikovo Gorodische
Gnyozdovo
Sarkel (9th century)

Literature
B. Trigger, A History of Archaeological Thought, McGill University, Montréal, pp. 327ff.
Mikhail Miller, Archaeology in the U.S.S.R, New York (1956).

See also
History of archaeology
History of Russia
History of Central Asia
Scythia
Kurgan hypothesis
List of Russian historians